The Baltimore–Washington telegraph line was the first long-distance telegraph system set up to run overland in the United States.

Building of line
In March 1843, the US Congress appropriated  to Samuel Morse to lay a telegraph line between Washington, D.C. and Baltimore, Maryland, along the right-of-way of the Baltimore and Ohio Railroad.

Morse originally decided to lay the wire underground, asking Ezra Cornell to lay the line using a special cable-laying plow that Cornell had developed. Wire began to be laid in Baltimore on October 21, 1843.

Morse learned that Cooke and Wheatstone were using poles for their lines in England and decided to follow their lead. Two 16-gauge copper wires were installed; they were insulated with cotton thread, shellac, and a mixture of "beeswax, resin, linseed oil, and asphalt." A test of the still incomplete line occurred on May 1, 1844, when news of the Whig Party's nomination of Henry Clay for U.S. President was sent from the party's convention in Baltimore to the Capitol Building in Washington.

Operations

Morse's line was demonstrated on May 24, 1844, from the Old Supreme Court Chamber in the United States Capitol in Washington to the Mount Clare station of the railroad in Baltimore, and commenced with the transmission of Morse's first message (from Washington) to Alfred Vail (in Baltimore), "What hath God wrought", a phrase from the Bible's Book of Numbers.  The phrase was suggested by Annie Ellsworth, whose husband was a supporter of Morse's, and knew Morse was religious.

As U.S. Postmaster General, Cave Johnson was in charge of the line.  Morse was made superintendent of the line, and Alfred Vail and Henry Rogers the operators.

The next year, Johnson reported that "the importance of [the line] to the public does not consist of any probable income that can ever be derived from it," which led to the invention being returned for private development.

See also
 First transcontinental telegraph
 Timeline of North American telegraphy

References

External links 
 Electronic Technology in the House of Representatives
 History of the Telegraph
 Contemporary account of the construction of the transcontinental telegraph

Telegraphy